Vesa Mäkäläinen (born September 3, 1986) is a Finnish professional basketball player. He currently plays for Lahti Basketball in Finland. Standing at 6 ft 6.7 in (2.00 m), he usually plays as forward.

External links
 Player profile at eurobasket2011.com

1986 births
Living people
Finnish men's basketball players
Forwards (basketball)
Kauhajoen Karhu players
Namika Lahti players
Kataja BC players
Lahti Basketball players
People from Hyvinkää
Sportspeople from Uusimaa